Belletto is a surname. Notable people with the surname include:

Al Belletto (1928–2014), American jazz saxophonist and clarinetist
René Belletto (born 1945), French writer

See also
Belletti